ISO/IEC 7813 is an international standard codified by the International Organization for Standardization and  International Electrotechnical Commission that defines properties of financial transaction cards, such as ATM or credit cards.

Scope
The standard defines:
 physical characteristics, such as size, shape, location of magnetic stripe, etc.
 magnetic track data structures

Physical characteristics
ISO/IEC 7813 specifies the following physical characteristics of the card, mostly by reference to other standards:

 Embossed characters  by reference to ISO/IEC 7811
 Embossing of expiration date  the format (MM/YY or MM-YY)
 Magnetic stripe  by reference to ISO/IEC 7811
 Integrated circuit with contacts  by reference to ISO/IEC 7816-1
 Integrated circuit without contacts  by reference to ISO/IEC 10536-1, ISO/IEC 14443-1, and ISO/IEC 15693-1

Magnetic tracks

Track 1
The Track 1 structure is specified as:
 STX : Start sentinel "%"
 FC : Format code "B" (The format described here. Format "A" is reserved for proprietary use.)
 PAN : Payment card number 4400664987366029, up to 19 digits
 FS : Separator "^"
 NM : Name, 2 to 26 characters (including separators, where appropriate, between surname, first name etc.)
 FS : Separator "^"
 ED : Expiration data, 4 digits or "^"
 SC : Service code, 3 digits or "^"
 DD : Discretionary data, balance of characters
 ETX : End sentinel "?"
 LRC : Longitudinal redundancy check, calculated according to ISO/IEC 7811-2
The maximum record length is 79 alphanumeric characters.

Examples

%B4815881002867896^YATES/EUGENE JOHN         ^37829821000123456789?

%B4815881002861896^YATES/EUGENE  L            ^^^356858      00998000000?

Track 2
The Track 2 structure is specified as:
 STX : Start sentinel ";"
 PAN : Primary Account Number, up to 19 digits, as defined in ISO/IEC 7812-1
 FS : Separator "="
 ED : Expiration date, YYMM or "=" if not present
 SC : Service code, 3 digits or "=" if not present
 DD : Discretionary data, balance of available digits
 ETX : End sentinel "?"
 LRC : Longitudinal redundancy check, calculated according to ISO/IEC 7811-2

The maximum record length is 40 numeric digits (e.g., 5095700000000).

Track 3
Track 3 is virtually unused by the major worldwide networks and often isn't even physically present on the card by virtue of a narrower magnetic stripe.

A notable exception to this is Germany, where Track 3 content was used nationally as the primary source of authorization and clearing information for debit card processing prior to the adoption of the "SECCOS" ICC standards. Track 3 is standardized nationally to contain both the cardholder's bank account number and branch sort code (BLZ).

Programming
Parsing Track 1 and Track 2 can be done with Regular Expressions.

Track 1

^%B([0-9]{1,19})\^([^\^]{2,26})\^([0-9]{4}|\^)([0-9]{3}|\^)([^\?]+)\?$

This Regex will capture all of the important fields into the following groups:

 Group 1: Payment card number (PAN)
 Group 2: Name (NM)
 Group 3: Expiration Date (ED)
 Group 4: Service Code (SC)
 Group 5: Discretionary data (DD)

Track 2

^\;([0-9]{1,19})\=([0-9]{4}|\=)([0-9]{3}|\=)([^\?]+)\?$

 Group 1: Primary Account Number (PAN)
 Group 2: Expiration date (ED)
 Group 3: Service code (SC)
 Group 4: Discretionary data (DD)

References

External links
 ISO/IEC 7813:2006

Implementations 
 Magnetic Track Parser, a Java library to parse magnetic track data
 Credit Card Track Data Parser, a Javscript library is for parsing credit card track data such as might be returned from a USB card reader
 magnet, a Ruby library for decoding the track data on magnetic stripe cards
 Magnetic-Stripe-Parser a .NET C Sharp library  to parse magnetic track data direct from stream reader

07813